The 1971 ATP Buenos Aires, also known as the South American Open Championships, was a combined men's and women's tennis tournament played on outdoor clay courts and held in Buenos Aires, Argentina. The men's event was part of the 1971 Pepsi-Cola Grand Prix. The even was held from 25 November though 1 December 1971. Željko Franulović and Helga Masthoff won the singles titles.

Finals

Men's singles

 Željko Franulović defeated  Ilie Năstase 6–3, 7–6, 6–1
 It was Franulovic's 7th ATP title of the year and the 11th of his ATP career.

Women's singles
 Helga Masthoff defeated  Heide Orth 6–4, 7–5

Men's doubles
 Željko Franulović /  Ilie Năstase defeated  Patricio Cornejo /  Jaime Fillol Sr.
 It was Franulovic's 6th ATP title of the year and the 10th of his ATP career. It was Nastase's 9th ATP title of the year and the 15th of his ATP career.

Women's doubles
 Helga Masthoff /  Heide Orth defeated  Ana María Pinto Bravo /  Raquel Giscafré 6–0, 6–2

References

Atp Buenos Aires, 1971
ATP Buenos Aires
ATP Buenos Aires
Buenos Aires
Davis
Davis